Sokołowski (feminine Sokołowska) is a Polish surname derived from the word sokół (falcon). Notable people with the surname include:

 Alfred Sokołowski (1849–1924), Polish doctor
 Andrzej Sokołowski (born 1948), Polish handball player
 Anita Sokołowska (born 1976), Polish actress
 Beata Sokołowska-Kulesza (born 1974), Polish sprint canoer
 Ben Sokolowski, Canadian television writer
 Diana Sokołowska (born 1996), Polish swimmer
 George Sokolowski (1917–1984), American politician 
 Heinz Sokolowski (1917–1965), German victim of the Berlin wall
 Howard Sokolowski, Canadian businessman and philanthropist 
 Jan Sokolowski (1899–1982), Polish ornithologist
 John Sokolowski (born 1975), Canadian bobsledder
 Kazimierz Sokołowski (1908–1998), Polish ice hockey player
 Linda Frum Sokolowski (born 1963), Canadian author and politician 
 Marek Sokołowski (born 1978), Polish footballer
 Marla Sokolowski, Canadian geneticist
 Michael Sokolowski (born 1962), Canadian sprinter
 Michał Sokołowski (born 1992), Polish basketball player
 Olena Ustymenko Sokolowski (born 1986), American volleyball player
 Patryk Sokołowski (born 1994), Polish footballer 
 Robert Sokolowski (born 1934), American philosopher
 Stefan Lech Sokołowski (1904–1940), Polish mathematician, climber and soldier
 Tomasz Sokolowski (disambiguation), several football players
 Włodzimierz Sokołowski (1940–2012), Polish athlete

See also 
 Sokołów County (Powiat sokołowski), a powiat in Masovian Voivodeship, Poland
 Wólka Sokołowska, a village in Gmina Sokołów Małopolski, Rzeszów County, Subcarpathian Voivodeship, Poland

Polish-language surnames